Route 420 or Highway 420 may refer to:

Australia
 Bass Highway (Victoria)
 South Gippsland Freeway
 South Gippsland Highway
 Bass Highway
 Phillip Island Road

Canada
 Ontario Highway 420
New Brunswick Route 420
Newfoundland and Labrador Route 420

Ireland
R420 road

Japan
 Japan National Route 420

Norway
 Norwegian County Road 420

Spain
N-420

United Kingdom

  A420 road (Bristol to Oxford)

United States
  Interstate 420 (multiple highways) (former)
  U.S. Route 420
  Florida State Road 420 (former)
  County Road 420 (Orange County, Florida)
  Louisiana Highway 420
  Indiana State Road 420 (now Interstate 94).
  New Mexico State Road 420
  New York State Route 420
  Ohio State Route 420
  Pennsylvania Route 420
  Puerto Rico Highway 420
  South Carolina Highway 420
  Tennessee State Route 420
  Farm to Market Road 420
  Virginia State Route 420
  Kentucky State Route 420